Chunga pitha, also known as chungapura pitha, is a traditional rice cake (pitha) originating in the Sylhet region of Bangladesh. Though its main ingredients are bamboo and glutinous (sticky) rice, it is also made with binni rice, milk, sugar, coconut, and rice powder. This unique delicacy is prepared when sticky rice is stuffed inside young bamboo and smoke slowly. It is popularly known as a distinct and traditional food in Bengali cuisine.

This traditional delicacy is also famous to the Assamese. It is prepared at the time of Magh Bihu or Bhogali Bihu, a harvest festival celebrated in India's northeastern Assam.

History
Fish bazaars have been very common throughout Bengal for centuries. People in the Sylhet region buy fish from these markets or catch big fish from the haors and rivers, and fry them to eat. It was seen as a shame not to offer chunga pitha, fried fish, and coconut milk/sweets or murabba, to guests or a new son-in-law at the end of a meal.

The various hill tribes of Sylhet had a tradition of cutting bamboo and putting wet rice inside it. Gradually, the food started to be popular from the hills to the Sylhetis living in the plains. In the course of time, this chunga (bamboo tube) dish came to be known as chunga pitha.

Though atap rice is the main food of the people of Sylhet region, they prefer glutinous rice to make this delicacy.

Ingredients
  (bamboo)
 glutinous rice
 milk
 sugar
 coconut
 rice powder

Procedure

To make this rice cake,  (a small type of bamboo) is required. This bamboo contains a special type of  especially oily chemical that helps not burn the bamboo shoots in a fire. Sticky rice rolled with banana leaf is inserted  into the bamboo tube. Then it is burned with straw to make chunga pitha. Due to the presence of excessive juice of the bamboo, the inner part of the tube is boiled in the heat of the fire. This bamboo is used to make different types of rice cakes. In some places, baking is occurred with sticky rice, milk, sugar, coconut, and rice powder.

Once the delicacy is prepared, the rice cake is shaped as a candle and separated from the tube.

References

See also 
 Bangladeshi cuisine
 Zongzi
 Sticky rice in bamboo
 Puto bumbong

Sweet pies
Sylheti cuisine
Glutinous rice dishes
Foods containing coconut
Assamese cuisine
Stuffed dishes
Pitha